If I Were a Carpenter is a 1994 tribute album to The Carpenters. It features alternative rock bands covering the songs of Richard and Karen Carpenter.

Overview
The cover is a cartoon-like drawing of Richard and Karen Carpenter listening to an LP album against an orange background.  Richard Carpenter has said that he doesn't "care for" the version of "Superstar" by Sonic Youth.

The album was the brainchild of Matt Wallace (Maroon 5, Replacements, Faith No More) and David Konjoyan.

Juno
The album, and specifically the Sonic Youth cover of "Superstar," featured prominently in the 2007 film Juno; "Superstar" was included on the Juno soundtrack .

Track listing

References

The Carpenters
Tribute albums
1994 compilation albums
Albums produced by Matt Wallace
A&M Records compilation albums
Alternative rock compilation albums
Indie rock compilation albums